Shariatpur Sadar is an upazila of Shariatpur District in the Division of Dhaka, Bangladesh. Shariatpur Thana was converted into an upazila in 1984. The upazila takes its name from the district and the Bengali word sadar (headquarters). It is the subdistrict where the district headquarters, Shariatpur town, is located.

Geography
It borders Zajira Upazila to the north, Naria and Bhedarganj upazilas to the east, Damudya Upazila to the southeast, and Madaripur District to the south and west.

Demographics

According to the 2011 Bangladesh census, Shariatpur Sadar Upazila had 45,883 households and a population of 210,259, 23.6% of whom lived in urban areas. 10.5% of the population was under the age of 5. The literacy rate (age 7 and over) was 51.2%, compared to the national average of 51.8%.

Administration
Shariatpur Sadar Upazila is divided into Shariatpur Municipality and 11 union parishads: Angaria, Binodpur, Chandrapur, Chikandi, Chitalia, Domsar, Mahmudpur, Palong, Rudrakar, Shaul Para, and Tulasar. The union parishads are subdivided into 105 mauzas and 152 villages.

Shariatpur Municipality was established in 1990. It is subdivided into 9 wards and 27 mahallas.

Education

There are three colleges in the upazila. They include the public Shariatpur Government College.

According to Banglapedia, Palong Tulasar Gurudas Government High School is a notable secondary school.

The madrasa education system includes one fazil madrasa.

There is a private university in this district named Z. H. Sikder University of science  and technology http://www.zhsust.edu.bd/ in bhedorgonj upazila. 
One newly established private medical college is also in this area named Monowara sikder medical college and hospital http://sikderhospital.com/

See also
Upazilas of Bangladesh
Districts of Bangladesh
Divisions of Bangladesh

References

Upazilas of Shariatpur District